Norridge is a village in Cook County, Illinois, United States. The population was 15,251 at the 2020 census. The village and its neighbor to the east, Harwood Heights, together form an enclave within the city of Chicago (i.e. they are surrounded by the city). Norridge is sometimes referred to as the "Island Within a City". The current President of Norridge is Daniel Tannhauser.

Name origin

The name "Norridge" was suggested by resident Mrs. Link. "Nor" comes from Norwood Park Township, and "Ridge" comes from the nearby suburb of Park Ridge.

History

Located in Norwood Park Township, the first names of what would become Norridge were "Goat Village", due to a local resident's goat farm, and "Swamp" due to a lack of streets and the area's swamp-like conditions. Norridge began as an  subdivision that ran from Ozanam Avenue in the west to Olcott Avenue in the east and from Irving Park Road in the south to Montrose Avenue in the north. In 1948, a local improvement association incorporated Norridge as a village, stymieing an effort by Chicago to annex the area.

That year, Karl Kuchar was elected the first President of the village.

The 1950s was a decade of growth and development, encouraged by the paving of sidewalks, streets, and curbs, and the installation of storm and sanitary sewers. In 1954 Norridge annexed land north from Montrose to Lawrence.

Norridge borders the Cook County Forest Preserves and was home to several horse stables, including Happy Days Stables at Montrose and Cumberland. Most of the stables were gone by the late 1970s.

Geography
Norridge is located at  (41.965030, -87.823859).

Demographics
As of the 2020 census there were 15,251 people, 5,530 households, and 3,700 families residing in the village. The racial makeup of the village was 82.94% White, 0.43% African American, 0.38% Native American, 6.08% Asian, 0.07% Pacific Islander, 4.36% from other races, and 5.74% from two or more races. Hispanic or Latino of any race were 11.74% of the population.

There were 5,530 households, out of which 46.20% had children under the age of 18 living with them, 52.30% were married couples living together, 9.76% had a female householder with no husband present, and 33.09% were non-families. 28.37% of all households were made up of individuals, and 16.37% had someone living alone who was 65 years of age or older. The average household size was 3.17 and the average family size was 2.54.

The village's age distribution consisted of 18.5% under the age of 18, 6.9% from 18 to 24, 22% from 25 to 44, 27.5% from 45 to 64, and 25.2% who were 65 years of age or older. The median age was 46.6 years. For every 100 females, there were 89.5 males. For every 100 females age 18 and over, there were 87.7 males.

The median income for a household in the village was $78,300, and the median income for a family was $93,170. Males had a median income of $58,365 versus $39,837 for females. The per capita income for the village was $36,959. About 1.9% of families and 3.9% of the population were below the poverty line, including 5.8% of those under age 18 and 4.7% of those age 65 or over.

Government
As of the 2021 elections, the current elected officials of the Village of Norridge are:

Daniel Tannhauser - President (since 2019)
Gabriela Krasinski - Clerk (since 2021)
Donald Gelsomino - Trustee (since 2011)
William Larson - Trustee (since 2019)
Jack Bielak - Trustee (since 2019)
Andrew Ronstadt - Trustee (since 2019)
Debra Budnik - Trustee (since 2021)
Frank Avino, Jr. - Trustee (since 2021)

Presidents of Norridge

Local culture

The Harlem Irving Plaza brought in sales tax that led to decreased property taxes. Begun in 1956 with 45 stores, the center had 140 stores by the 1990s. The center has grown immensely since, with the opening of stores such as Target, Best Buy, and Hobby Lobby, among others.

Education

Public schools
Public elementary school districts serving Norridge include: 
 Pennoyer Elementary School District 79
 Norridge School District 80 (James Giles School and John V. Leigh School)
 Union Ridge School District 86

Public high school districts include:
 Maine Township High School District 207 (Maine South High School)
 Ridgewood High School District 234

Churches
 Divine Savior Church (Merged with St. Eugene Church and Our Lady Mother of the Church)

Libraries
Eisenhower Public Library District serves Harwood Heights and Norridge.

Notable people 

 Bruce Artwick, creator of the first consumer flight simulator software; founder of Sublogic
 Nicholas Calabrese, the first made man ever to testify against the Chicago Outfit
 James Fotopoulos, independent filmmaker of over 100 films, including Christabel
 Robert F. Martwick Jr., Democratic member of the Illinois Senate; formerly a Norridge trustee
 Gene Nudo, head coach of the Arizona Rattlers, then of the Arena Football League
 Jeff Schroeder, season 11 and season 13 contestant on  Big Brother, season 16 contestant on The Amazing Race
 Dino Stamatopoulos, comedy writer, actor and producer (Mr. Show, TV Funhouse, Mad TV, The Dana Carvey Show, Late Show with David Letterman and Late Night with Conan O'Brien)
 Joseph A. Tunzi, author, publisher, self-publisher, producer, archivist, researcher and historian; has been described as "one of the foremost authorities on Elvis Presley"

References

External links

 Village of Norridge official website
 Quick Facts, village of Norridge
 Norridge, IL, Encyclopedia of Chicago
 Norridge Park District
 Eisenhower Public Library District

Villages in Illinois
Villages in Cook County, Illinois
Chicago metropolitan area
Populated places established in 1948
1948 establishments in Illinois
Enclaves in the United States